Leomont Dozier Evans (born July 12, 1974) is a former American football safety in the National Football League (NFL) for the Washington Redskins.  He also played for the Los Angeles Xtreme of the XFL.  He played college football at Clemson University and was drafted in the fifth round of the 1996 NFL Draft. In 2002, Evans suffered a serious neck injury in the first half of the Houston Texans' NFL debut against the New York Giants.

He has 3 children, Kamyia, 24, Cierra, 18, and son Leomont Jr., 22.

References

External links
 

1974 births
Living people
People from Abbeville, South Carolina
American football safeties
Clemson Tigers football players
Washington Redskins players
Los Angeles Xtreme players